The women's 800 metres at the 2022 World Athletics Championships was held at the Hayward Field in Eugene from 21 to 24 July 2022.

Summary

With the elimination of defending champion Halimah Nakaayi in the semis, the rest of the podiums of the Olympics and previous World Championships were represented in the final. Olympic Champion Athing Mu, silver medalist Keely Hodgkinson, Mary Moraa and Diribe Welteji all wanted to lead, the four spread shoulder to shoulder across the track after the break line. Welteji emerged the leader, Mu on her shoulder, Hodgkinson on the rail and Moraa boxing her in on the outside. They held that formation through the bell at 57.11 and into the turn putting a 2m gap on the remaining competitors. Just before the backstretch, Mu made her move into the lead, opening up a 2 m gap before the final turn. Hodgkinson got around Welteji and went off in search of Mu, putting 2m back to Moraa and Welteji with returning silver medalist, Olympic bronze medalist Raevyn Rogers and Natoya Goule coming back to join them. With 110m to go, Mu took the turn wide and seemed to slow, enough that Hodgkinson was able to grab the inside position on Mu. The two ran shoulder to shoulder down the home stretch, with Moraa and Welteji having a similar battle 2m behind them. Bumping elbows both in lane 1, Hodgkinson gained a slight advantage, then Mu came back to get the edge. Unlike the runaway in the Olympics, Mu barely opened a gap on Hodgkinson, taking a lean at the line just to be sure.  Behind them, Moraa was able to separate from Welteji for the bronze. At age 21, Moraa was the senior citizen amongst the top four, the other three still age 20.

Records
Before the competition records were as follows:

Qualification standard
The standard to qualify automatically for entry was 1:59.50.

Schedule
The event schedule, in local time (UTC−7), was as follows:

Results

Heats 
The first 3 athletes in each heat (Q) and the next 6 fastest (q) qualify to the semi-finals.

Semi-finals 
The first 2 athletes in each heat (Q) and the next 2 fastest (q) qualify to the final.

Final 
The final was started on 24 July at 18:35.

References

800
800 metres at the World Athletics Championships